Alcools (English: Alcohols) is a collection of poems by the French author Guillaume Apollinaire. His first major collection was published in 1913. 

The first poem in the collection, Zone (an epic poem of Paris), has been called  "the great poem of early Modernism" by the scholar Martin Sorrell.

The poems of the collection, in alphabetic order
 1909
 À la Santé
 Automne malade
 Automne
 Annie
 Chantre
 Clair de lune
 Clotilde
 Cors de chasse
 Cortège
 Crépuscule
 Hôtels
 L'Adieu
 L'Émigrant de Landor Road
 L'Ermite
 La Blanche Neige
 La Chanson du Mal Aimé
 La Dame
 La Loreley
 La Maison des morts
 La Porte
 La Synagogue
 La Tzigane
 Le Brasier
 Le Larron
 Le Pont Mirabeau
 Le Vent nocturne
 Le Voyageur
 Les Cloches
 Les Colchiques
 Les Femmes
 Les Fiançailles
 Les Sapins
 Lul de Faltenin
 Mai
 Marie
 Marizibill
 Merlin
 Merlin et la Vieille Femme
 Nuit rhénane
 Palais
 Poème lu au mariage d'André Salmon
 Rhénane d'automne
 Rosemonde
 Salomé
 Saltimbanques
 Schinderhannes
 Signe
 Un soir
 Vendémiaire
 Zone (voir : Pihis)

See also 
Le Monde 100 Books of the Century

External links

 
Alcools (English translation by A. S. Kline)

Works by Guillaume Apollinaire
1913 poems
French poetry